Hoffenberg is a surname. Notable people with the surname include:

Marvin Hoffenberg (1914–2012), American economist and political scientist
Mason Hoffenberg (1922–1986), American writer
Raymond Hoffenberg (1923–2007), South African endocrinologist
Steven Hoffenberg, American fraudster